is a Japanese actor and voice actor from Shizuoka, Shizuoka. He is attached to Bambina and was previously attached to the Shiki Theatre Company.

Filmography

Television drama
Kōmyō Gatsuji (2006) – Heizaburō Isono

Musicals
Annie (1990) – Rooster 
Cats – Munkustrap
Miss Saigon (1992–1993) – John 
Sakura Taisen Kayō Show – Kōsuke Dan

Television animation
Yu-Gi-Oh! Duel Monsters (2002) – Konosuke Oshita
Gunslinger Girl (2003) – Franco
Get Ride! AM Driver (2004) – Father
Mutsu Enmei Ryū Gaiden: Shura no Toki (2004) – Genjirō Kuki

OVA
Sakura Wars: The Radiant Gorgeous Blooming Cherry Blossoms (1999) – Kōsuke Dan

Video games
Kingdom Hearts – Lock
Kingdom Hearts II – Captain Li Shang, Lock
Kingdom Hearts 358/2 Days – Lock

Dubbing roles

Live-action
Exodus: Gods and Kings – Aaron (Andrew Tarbet)
Métal Hurlant Chronicles – Sheriff Jones (Michael Biehn), Holgarth (John Rhys-Davies)
The Muppet Christmas Carol – Rizzo the Rat
Muppet Treasure Island – Rizzo the Rat
Space Jam – Monstar Bupkus

Animation
Alice in Wonderland – Broom Dog
The Land Before Time IV: Journey Through the Mists – Ichy
Mulan – Captain Li Shang
Mulan II – General Li Shang
The Nightmare Before Christmas – Lock
Pocahontas – Kocoum
The Powerpuff Girls – Him, Ace, Junior

References

External links
Home page

1954 births
Japanese male voice actors
Living people
People from Shizuoka (city)
Male voice actors from Shizuoka Prefecture